Stadtkind is the debut album by German experimental techno musician Ellen Allien. Released on Allien's own label, BPitch Control in 2001, it was an homage to the city of Berlin, whose post-reunification culture inspired the work. The album's title means "city child" in German.

Track listing
"Send" – 6:27
"Fensterbrettmusik" – 5:19
"Tief in Mir" – 5:05
"Stadtkind" – 5:14
"Shorty" – 3:40
"Funkenflug der Träume" – 4:21
"Salzsee" – 4:30
"Licht" – 5:03
"Wolken Ziehen" – 5:30
"Trust and ..." – 3:20
"Data Romance" – 4:02

References

External links
 [ Stadtkind] at Allmusic
 Stadtkind at Discogs
 Stadtkind video at Vimeo

2001 debut albums
Ellen Allien albums
BPitch Control albums